The Devil and the Smalander may refer to:

 The Devil and the Smalander (1927 film), Swedish silent film
 The Devil and the Smalander (1949 film), Swedish film